Mikkel Vendelbo (born 15 August 1987) is a Danish professional footballer who plays as a midfielder.

References

External links
Mikkel Vendelbo on Silkeborg IF website
National team profile
Career statistics at Danmarks Radio

1987 births
Living people
People from Esbjerg
Association football midfielders
Danish men's footballers
Denmark youth international footballers
Aarhus Gymnastikforening players
Esbjerg fB players
Hønefoss BK players
Holstein Kiel players
Holstein Kiel II players
Silkeborg IF players
Skive IK players
Danish Superliga players
Eliteserien players
3. Liga players
Danish expatriate men's footballers
Expatriate footballers in Norway
Expatriate footballers in Germany
Danish expatriate sportspeople in Norway
Danish expatriate sportspeople in Germany
Danish 1st Division players
Sportspeople from the Region of Southern Denmark